Ray's Pizza, and its many variations such as "Ray's Original Pizza", "Famous Ray's Pizza" and "World-Famous Original Ray's Pizza", are the names of dozens of pizzerias in the New York City area that are generally completely independent (a few have multiple locations) but may have similar menus, signs, and logos.

History
Ralph Cuomo opened the first Ray's Pizza, at 27 Prince Street in Little Italy, in 1959, named after his nickname "Raffie". In the 1960s he briefly owned a second Ray's Pizza, but sold it to Rosolino Mangano in 1964. Mangano kept the name and later claimed that his was the first. In 1973, Mario Di Rienzo named his new pizzeria Ray's Pizza (which is now closed) after, he claimed, the nickname for his family in Italy. Also that year, Joseph Bari purchased a pizzeria from Mangano and renamed it, and several others, as Ray Bari Pizza. By 1991, dozens of pizzerias in New York City had "Ray's" in their name, as well as those in other American states.

In 1981, Gary Esposito purchased a pizzeria from Mangano. After opening several more "Original Ray's" restaurants, he partnered with Cuomo and Mangano to combine independent "Ray's" restaurants into an official franchise chain.  there were at least 49 restaurants by some variant of that name in the New York City telephone directory, including one named Not Ray's Pizza. 

The first Ray's Pizza closed its doors on Sunday, October 30, 2011, following a legal dispute over rent and a lease that followed its owner's death in 2008. Half of the space that once housed Ray's Pizza has been leased to a new company, Prince Street Pizza. Meanwhile, Famous Ray's Pizza on Sixth Avenue and 11th Street (pictured), which had served pizza since the 1970s, closed down in 2011, reopened under the name "Famous Roio's Pizza" in 2012, and closed again in 2013. A  Chinese restaurant now occupies the space.

In popular culture

The confusion of various Ray's Pizzas is featured in a gag in 1997 Simpsons episode "The City of New York vs. Homer Simpson." While waiting for a traffic officer beside the World Trade Center, Homer spots a pizza parlour named "Original Famous Ray's (Not Affiliated With Famous Original Ray's)."

In the TV Show, Friends, Rachel can be seen with a pizza box from Ray Bari Pizza. This leads fans to think that the pizza store the friends frequent is Ray Bari Pizza.

In the episode "The Caste System" in the second season of Sex and the City, Miranda accompanies her boyfriend Steve to Famous Original Ray's Pizza located at 204 West 9th Avenue in Chelsea.

In the 2003 film Elf, Santa Claus tells Buddy the Elf, "Second, there are, like, 30 Ray's Pizzas. They all claim to be the original, but the real one's on 11th."

In the 2008 film Iron Man, Obadiah Stane brings Tony Stark Ray's Pizza back from his business trip to New York.

See also

 New York-style pizza
 List of Italian restaurants
 List of pizza chains of the United States
 List of restaurants in New York City

References

External links
 

Italian-American culture in New York City
Italian restaurants in the United States
Pizzerias in New York City
Restaurants established in 1959
1959 establishments in New York City